Montreal Castors was a Canadian soccer team, founded in 1975. The team played in the National Soccer League, winning the championship in 1978 and 1979 before withdrawing from the league in 1979.

The Castors played their home games at the Claude-Robillard Stadium in Montreal, which was built for the 1976 Summer Olympics.

History
Italian-born businessman, Tony Iammatteo, founded the club in 1975. The Castors featured several star soccer players from Europe and South America, including Brito, Cané, Aguinaldo Moreira, Lima, Toninho Guerreiro, Franco Gallina and Igor Bachner, and Canada men's national soccer team regulars such as Tino Lettieri and Gordon Wallace. In 1978, the team compiled a 15-1-4 record as they won the National Soccer League for the first time. The following season, the team had a 16-1-3 record as it won the league a second consecutive time.

Year-by-year

Honours
National Soccer League: 2
1978, 1979

References

External links

Association football clubs established in 1975
Canadian National Soccer League teams
Association football clubs disestablished in 1979
1975 establishments in Quebec
1979 disestablishments in Quebec
Soccer clubs in Montreal